
Stainby is a hamlet in the South Kesteven district of Lincolnshire, England.

Stainby is nominally in the civil parish of Gunby and Stainby , although the parish is now administered as part of the Colsterworth district parishes. Stainby had been a parish in its own right until 1931. Adjacent villages include Buckminster, North Witham, Colsterworth, Gunby, Sewstern and Skillington.

Stainby is on the B676 road which runs between Melton Mowbray (Buckminster Road) and Colsterworth (Colsterworth Road). The road is frequented by heavy goods vehicles from the nearby industrial estate at Sewstern and by vehicles heading from the Midlands towards East Anglia; an alternative route is through Wymondham and South Witham.
 
Stainby is recorded in the 1086 Domesday Book as "Stigandebi". The remains of a Motte, probably associated with the former Manor House, stand in the village.

There are no shops or public houses - the nearest are in Colsterworth. The church, on Main Road, is dedicated to St Peter. The former Stainby quarry is an event venue for vehicle off-roading.

See also
Stainby railway station

References

External links

 "Stainby", Genuki

South Kesteven District
Hamlets in Lincolnshire
Former civil parishes in Lincolnshire